Miguel DePaula Asencio (born September 29, 1980) is a former Major League Baseball pitcher. In 11 games, he went 0–2 with a 6.55 ERA.

Asencio was signed by the Philadelphia Phillies as an amateur free agent on July 2, 1998. He pitched for the Gulf Coast Phillies in  going 1–4 with an ERA of 5.97. Miguel split the  season between Clearwater and Batavia. Asencio held opponents to a .224 batting average while at Clearwater and a .191 average at Batavia. He continued to pitch for Clearwater during the  season posting 12–5 record with an ERA of 2.84. Asencio was named to the Florida State League All-Star Team and was the FSL player of the week from July 16–22.

The Kansas City Royals acquired him in the  Rule 5 Draft. Miguel spent the entire year with the club compiling a 4–7 record and an ERA of 5.11. His Major League debut in relief versus the Chicago White Sox on April 6, 2002, was inauspicious as his first 16 pitches were out of the strike zone, forcing in a run before he even threw his first Major League strike. He spent the  season recovering from Tommy John surgery. His stint with the Padres did not last long, as he was released in June later that year. Asencio only appeared in three games for the Rockies going 1–0 with a 4.70 ERA. The Houston Astros acquired Asencio in a trade on December 12, . In September , Asencio was designated for assignment. In January , Asencio signed a minor league contract with the Boston Red Sox and became a free agent after the season.

References

External links

1980 births
Living people
Batavia Muckdogs players
Clearwater Phillies players
Colorado Rockies players
Colorado Springs Sky Sox players
Corpus Christi Hooks players
Dominican Republic expatriate baseball players in the United States
Kansas City Royals players
Lake Elsinore Storm players
Major League Baseball pitchers
Major League Baseball players from the Dominican Republic
Pawtucket Red Sox players
People from Santo Domingo Norte
Portland Beavers players
Portland Sea Dogs players
Round Rock Express players
Wichita Wranglers players